İzmir Coach Bus Terminal (Turkish: , often abbreviated as ) is a bus terminal located in İzmir, Turkey. The bus station entered into service in December 1998.

History 
İzmir had a coach bus terminal in Basmane, then moved to Halkapınar in 1975. İzmir Metropolitan Municipality initiated a project tender to build a new coach bus terminal; Merih Karaaslan and İlker Aksu's project won tender. İZOTAŞ signed a BOT contract with municipality in September 1996, and initiated a tender for build. The bus terminal's base laid at 8 May 1997, then the bus terminal opened at 14 December 1998. İZOTAŞ will have operating right for the bus terminal until 2023.

Architecture 
İzmir Coach Bus Terminal built on 150.000 m² area. It is the Turkey's biggest bus terminal with 120.000 m² closed area. The bus station has 146 platform for buses. Also, it has a three-star hotel, 2 gas stations, parking lot for 1200 vehicles, and a conference hall that includes 300 seats.

Service 
172 transportation companies are in operation. Approximately 75.000 passengers are transported daily.

References

External links 
 

Bus stations in Turkey 
Buildings and structures in İzmir
Transport infrastructure completed in 1998 
1998 establishments in Turkey